South Main Street Historic District is a national historic district located at Geneva in Ontario County, New York. The district contains 142 contributing properties including 140 contributing buildings, as well as Pultney Park and the original quadrangle of the Hobart College campus.  Over half of the structures date from 1825 to 1850.

It was listed on the National Register of Historic Places in 1974.

References

External links

All of the following Historic American Buildings Survey (HABS) records are filed under Geneva, Ontario County, NY:

Historic districts on the National Register of Historic Places in New York (state)
Historic districts in Ontario County, New York
Geneva, New York
National Register of Historic Places in Ontario County, New York